The following lists events that happened during 1963 in New Zealand.

Population
 Estimated Population as of 31 December: 2,566,900
 Increase since 31 December 1962: 51,100 (2.03%)
 Males per 100 Females: 100.8

Incumbents

Regal and Vice Regal
Head of State – Elizabeth II
Governor-General – Brigadier Sir Bernard Fergusson GCMG GCVO DSO OBE.

Government
The 33rd New Zealand Parliament concluded and a general election was held on 30 November. This saw the National Party returned with the loss of one seat to have a majority of 10 seats.
Speaker of the House – Ronald Algie.
Prime Minister – Keith Holyoake
Deputy Prime Minister – Jack Marshall.
Minister of Finance – Harry Lake.
Minister of Foreign Affairs – Keith Holyoake.
Attorney-General – Ralph Hanan.
Chief Justice — Sir Harold Barrowclough

Parliamentary opposition 
 Leader of the Opposition –   Walter Nash (Labour) until 31 March, then  Arnold Nordmeyer (Labour).

Main centre leaders
Mayor of Auckland – Dove-Myer Robinson
Mayor of Hamilton – Denis Rogers
Mayor of Wellington – Frank Kitts
Mayor of Christchurch – George Manning
Mayor of Dunedin – Stuart Sidey

Events 

 6 February – Elizabeth II arrives in New Zealand on the Royal Yacht Britannia for the 1963 Royal Tour of New Zealand.
 7 February – 15 people killed in a bus crash due to brake failure in the Brynderwyn Hills in Northland.
 4 April – BOAC launches New Zealand's first jet-powered air service between Auckland Whenuapai and London Heathrow using the De Havilland Comet. The route takes 37.5 hours, with stops in Sydney, Darwin, Singapore, Rangoon or Calcutta, Karachi, Beirut or Damascus, and Rome or Düsseldorf.
 17 April – Tauranga becomes a city.
 3 July – New Zealand National Airways Corporation Flight 441 crashes into the Kaimai Ranges, killing all 23 aboard.
 7 December – Two people are killed in the Bassett Road machine gun murders.

Arts and literature
Maurice Shadbolt wins the Robert Burns Fellowship.

See 1963 in art, 1963 in literature

Music

See: 1963 in music

Radio and Television
There are 80,000 television licences issued, and an estimated 300,000 television viewers in New Zealand. 
Broadcast relay stations at Mount Te Aroha, Wharite Peak and Otahoua are commissioned, extending television coverage to Waikato, Tauranga, Manawatu and Wairarapa.

See: 1963 in New Zealand television, 1963 in television, List of TVNZ television programming, :Category:Television in New Zealand, :Category:New Zealand television shows, Public broadcasting in New Zealand

Film

See: :Category:1963 film awards, 1963 in film, List of New Zealand feature films, Cinema of New Zealand, :Category:1963 films

Sport

Athletics
Jeff Julian wins his first national title in the men's marathon, clocking 2:22:52 on 9 March in Hawera.

Chess
 The 70th National Chess Championship is held in Christchurch. The title is shared by Ortvin Sarapu and R.J. Sutton, both of Auckland.

Horse racing

Harness racing
 New Zealand Trotting Cup – Cardigan Bay
 Auckland Trotting Cup – Cardigan Bay (2nd win)

Lawn bowls
The national outdoor lawn bowls championships are held in Wellington.
 Men's singles champion – A. Govorko (Ngongotaha Bowling Club)
 Men's pair champions – S.W. Jolly, J.N.S. Flett (skip) (Point Chevalier Bowling Club)
 Men's fours champions – J.D. Scott, N. Cash, J. Coltman, Bill O'Neill (skip) (Carlton Bowling Club)

Soccer
 The Chatham Cup was won by North Shore United who beat Nomads of Christchurch 3–1 in the final.
 Provincial league champions:
	Auckland:	North Shore United
	Bay of Plenty:	Kahukura
	Buller:	Millerton Rangers
	Canterbury:	Nomads
	Franklin:	Manurewa AFC
	Hawke's Bay:	Napier Rovers
	Manawatu:	Thistle
	Marlborough:	Woodbourne
	Nelson:	Rangers
	Northland:	Otangarei United
	Otago:	King Edward Technical College OB
	Poverty Bay:	Eastern Union
	South Canterbury:	Northern Hearts
	Southland:	Invercargill Thistle
	Taranaki:	Moturoa
	Waikato:	Hamilton Wanderers
	Wairarapa:	Lansdowne United
	Wanganui:	Wanganui United
	Wellington:	Diamond
	West Coast:	Cobden-Kohinoor
 The second (and last) Rothmans Cup (see 1962) was won by North Shore United.

Births
 10 January: Malcolm Dunford, footballer
 21 February: Greg Turner, golfer.
 16 March: Kevin Smith, actor.
 4 June: Sean Fitzpatrick, rugby union player.
 18 June: Paul Honiss, rugby referee.
 20 July: Catherine Campbell, cricketer.
20 July: Mike Davidson, freestyle swimmer.
20 August: Ian Woodley, field hockey goalkeeper.
26 August: Christine Arthur, field hockey player.
 9 September (in England): Sarah Illingworth, cricketer.
 10 September: Jay Laga'aia, actor.
 17 September: Warren Gatland, rugby player and coach.
 11 December: Mark Greatbatch, cricketer.
 24 December: David Grundy, field hockey player.
 Joanna Bourke, historian.
 Andrew Johnston, poet.
 (in Poland): Ralph Talmont, photographer.

Deaths
 7 January: Tapihana Paraire Paikea, politician.
 19 March: Fred Hackett, politician.
 4 April: Hercules Wright, rugby union player.
 16 May: Fintan Patrick Walsh, trade unionist. 
 18 June Albert Samuel, politician
 4 July: (in England) Bernard Freyberg, 1st Baron Freyberg, soldier, Governor-General of New Zealand.
 14 July: Maud Basham (Aunt Daisy), radio personality.
 19 August: Rosemary Frances Rees, writer and theatre producer. 
 19 September: Sir David Low, cartoonist (in London).
 Te Iki-o-te-rangi Pouwhare',  tribal leader, historian and genealogist.
:Category:1963 deaths

See also
List of years in New Zealand
Timeline of New Zealand history
History of New Zealand
Military history of New Zealand
Timeline of the New Zealand environment
Timeline of New Zealand's links with AntarcticaFor world events and topics in 1963 not specifically related to New Zealand see'': 1963

References

External links

 
New Zealand
Years of the 20th century in New Zealand